Oguri Cap (Japanese : オグリキャップ, 27 March 1985 – 3 July 2010) was a Japanese thoroughbred racehorse, sired by Dancing Cap. Oguri Cap was inducted into the Japan Racing Association Hall of Fame in 1991.

Racing career 

In May 1987 Oguri Cap made his debut at Kasamatsu Racecourse in Gifu Prefecture. After winning 9 starts in 11 races, including 7 consecutive victories and 4 stakes wins, he was transferred to the ownership of Chuo Horse Racing in January 1988 and recorded 13 more wins including four Grade I stakes, two Grade II stakes, and four Grade III stakes. Some of his biggest wins include the Mile Championship (G1), 2 wins in the Arima Kinen (Grand Prix) (G1), and a win in the Yasuda Kinen (G1). He also racked up victories in the New Zealand Trophy (G2), Takamatsunomiya Kinen (G2), and 2 wins in the Mainichi Ōkan (G2).

In 1988 Oguri Cap won JRA Best Three-Year-Old Colt and in 1990 he won JRA Best Older Male Horse and Japanese Horse of the Year. Nicknames include "Oguri" and the "Grey-Haired Monster".

 Other Major Racing Wins
 1989 Sankei Sho All Comers (G3) [NSR]
 1988 Mainichi Broadcast. Kyoto Yonsaitokubetsu (G3)
 1988 Mainichi Hai (G3)
 1988 Pegasus Stakes (G3)

Retirement 

After retirement in 1991, Oguri Cap was sent to the Yushun Stallion Station to stand stud. He was not able to produce any racers of his caliber, and in 2007 he was retired from stud duty. After retirement, he lived as a pensioned stallion at the Yushun Stallion Station. On July 3, 2010, he fractured one of the tibias in his legs, and was subsequently euthanized.

Popular culture 

An anthropomorphized version of Oguri Cap has made an appearance in the video game and anime Uma Musume Pretty Derby, and is also the main character of the manga Uma Musume Cinderella Gray.

In the manga/anime series Nichijou, one of character Mai Minakami's dogs is named Oguri Cap.

Pedigree

See also
 List of historical horses

References

1985 racehorse births
2010 racehorse deaths
Racehorses bred in Japan
Racehorses trained in Japan
Japanese Thoroughbred Horse of the Year
Thoroughbred family 7-d